Internal enemy refers to individuals or groups within one country who are perceived as a threat to that country. The distinction between internal and external enemies is discussed in Plato's Republic. Groups considered internal enemies by the countries in which they reside include Kurds in Turkey, Palestinians in Israel, Muslims in Western countries, and political dissidents under Latin American dictators.

See also
Fifth column

References

Political terminology
Political people
Minorities
Dissidents
Exiled politicians